Mikawasawa Dam is a gravity dam located in Tochigi prefecture in Japan. The dam is used for flood control and water supply. The catchment area of the dam is 13.9 km2. The dam impounds about 7  ha of land when full and can store 899 thousand cubic meters of water. The construction of the dam was started on 1984 and completed in 2003.

References

Dams in Tochigi Prefecture
2003 establishments in Japan